Park Live is an annual international music festival, which takes place in Moscow, Russia.
The main point of festival is to bring "pop-culture heroes of our time" to Russia.

A lot of artists who have played concerts at Park Live were in Russia for the first time.

2013 
The first festival was held at the All-Russia Exhibition Centre for three days from June 28 to 30.
The event was headlined by Limp Bizkit, The Killers, and Zemfira.
In addition, on the night of June 29–30, Park Live Night was held at the Chemical Stage, located in the pavilion of VDNKh No. 20 "Chemical Industry" from 23 p.m. to 6 a.m. the next day.

The festival attracted around twenty-five to thirty thousand visitors.

2014

Moscow 
The 2014 festival was held at All-Russia Exhibition Centre for three days from the June 27 to 29.
The event was headlined by Marilyn Manson, The Prodigy, and Deftones.

Kyiv 
Kyiv held its own event in-line with the Park Live festival on the same dates. Initially, the festival was planned to be held at the Expocenter of Ukraine 3 days in a row, but due to the unfavorable political situation in the city, then a decision was made to change the format of the festival in Kyiv. 
The event was to be held at the Stereo Plaza concert club on June 26 and 27. The headliner of the first day was to be the Deftones and the headliners of the second day were to be Enter Shikari and Wolfmother.

Also on June 28 and 29 concerts of two previously planned groups(Wild Beasts and Skillet), as well as a special guest deTach, were to be held at the Sentrum and Stereo Plaza clubs as part of the Park Live Kyiv festival.

2015 

In 2015, Park Live festival was held in Moscow at the Otkritie Arena stadium on June 19. The headliner of the day was the famous British band Muse. This was the first time the festival has reduced the number of days from three to one.

2016

Moscow 

In 2016, the festival was again held in Moscow at the Otkrytie Arena stadium on July 9 and 10. The American rock band Red Hot Chili Peppers became the headliner of the first day of the festival, and the American singer Lana Del Rey became the headliner on July 10.

2017 

In 2017, the festival was held in Moscow at the VEB Arena stadium on July 5. The headliner of the day was the American rock band System of a Down.

2018 

In 2018, the festival changed its venue again. This time it was held on the territory of the Gorky Park on July 27, July 28 and 29. The headliner of the first day was a French DJ and producer David Guetta, the headliner of the second day was the British band Gorillaz (for the first time in Russia), the headliner of the third was Massive Attack. Ticket sales began on November 30, 2017.

On the second day of the festival, Gorillaz's performance was interrupted due to a thunderstorm and heavy rain.

2019 

In 2019, the festival was held on the territory of the Gorky Park on July 12–14. The headliner of the first day was the British rock band Bring Me the Horizon, the headliner of the second day was Thirty Seconds to Mars, the headliner of the third was Die Antwoord. Ticket sales began on December 14, 2018.

On March 5, 2019, The Prodigy, which was supposed to become the headliner of the third day, announced the cancellation of all its concerts, including in Russia, in connection with the death of lead singer Keith Flint. On March 15, Park Live festival organisers announce new festival headliner – band from South Africa Die Antwoord.

2020 
The 2020 edition of the festival was cancelled due to the coronavirus pandemic.

The festival was originally scheduled to be held on July 17–19. My Chemical Romance was announced as headliners as part of their worldwide reunion tour.

Due to the cancellation, the 2021 edition was scheduled to take place over 8 days, with artists originally announced for 2020 to perform in 2021 if possible.

2021 
The 2021 edition of the festival was cancelled due to the coronavirus pandemic.

2022 

In 2022, the Park Live festival was cancelled due to the Russo-Ukrainian War after the event was already scheduled. The festival was to be held on the territory of the Luzhniki Olympic Complex on June 16–19 & July 7–10/14-17.

References

External links 
 

Rock festivals in Russia
Music festivals in Russia
Music festivals established in 2013